Vernon Zimmerman is an American writer and director who made his debut as director with the 1962 short Lemon Hearts starring Taylor Mead. He collaborated with Terrence Malick on the script to his directorial debut, the road movie, Deadhead Miles. Zimmerman wrote and directed the Claudia Jennings roller derby drive-in film Unholy Rollers. He is most well known for his horror slasher film Fade to Black, a dark and despairing psychological study of an awkward and alienated hardcore film buff who exacts a harsh revenge on his cruel tormentors. Zimmerman received a Saturn Award nomination as Best Director for the film, a predecessor to more well-known modern parodies of the horror genre. Vernon also wrote the scripts for the horror-Western Hex (a.k.a. Charmed), the redneck crime exploitation film Bobbie Jo and the Outlaw, the made-for-TV wrestling comedy/drama Mad Bull, the failed TV pilot film Shooting Stars, and the teen fantasy comedy Teen Witch. Zimmerman's latest film is the six-minute comic short Chuck and Wally on the Road. More recently Vernon has been working as a script analyst. He also teaches screen-writing courses at UCLA's Extension and Certificate Program. Zimmerman also taught classes on both writing feature scripts and directing actors for film and television at the USC School of Cinema and Television. Vernon Zimmerman lives in Los Angeles and is a member of both the Writers Guild of America and the Directors Guild of America.

Filmography
 To L.A. with Lust (short) (1961)
 Lemon Hearts (short) (1962)
 The College (documentary) (1964)
 Deadhead Miles (1972) also writer
 Unholy Rollers (1972) also writer
 Hex (1973) writer only
 Bobbie Jo and the Outlaw (1976) writer only
 Mad Bull (TV movie) (1977) writer only
 Fade to Black (1980) also writer
 Shooting Stars (TV film) (1983) writer only
 Teen Witch (1989) writer only
 Chuck and Wally on the Road (short) (1995)

References

External links

Living people
American male screenwriters
American film directors
American film producers
Horror film directors
Year of birth missing (living people)